The PRR C1 was the Pennsylvania Railroad's class of 0-8-0 steam locomotive, used in switching service. The 0-8-0 was common on most railroads, but not on PRR; when the railroad needed bigger motive power, they used the 2-8-0 "Consolidation". The PRR wanted the best motive power to handle the switching chores at rail yards and interchanges, and the C1 class was the heaviest two-cylinder 0-8-0 switcher ever produced. Calculated tractive effort was 76,154 lb, based on 78% MEP with 60% maximum cutoff. All C1s were retired between 1948 and 1953, none being preserved.

Steam locomotives of the United States
C1
0-8-0 locomotives
Railway locomotives introduced in 1925
Scrapped locomotives
Standard gauge locomotives of the United States

Shunting locomotives